La Ruche may refer to:

 La Ruche (residence), artists' residence in Paris
 La Ruche (school), early 1900s anarchist school outside Paris

See also 

 Beehive (disambiguation)